Flushing Airport is a decommissioned airfield in northern Queens in New York City. It is located in the neighborhood of College Point, near Flushing. The airfield was in operation from 1929 to 1984.

History
Flushing Airport was constructed atop  of wetlands beginning in 1927. The airport opened two years later, in May 1929. At the time, it was the last privately-owned airfield in Queens. The airport quickly became one of the main airports in the New York City area. It was originally called Speed's Airport and was one of the busiest airports in New York City before the emergence of the larger LaGuardia Airport (which opened in 1939). In the early 1970s a skywriting company operated there. Without space for expansion, the airport became very crowded as time passed. In 1977, a Piper Twin Comanche crashed shortly after taking off, killing those on board. This incident, as well as frequent flooding, led to the closing of this airport in 1984.

The airport has largely reverted to wetland; its only outlet is Mill Creek, a tributary of the Flushing River and Flushing Bay. Several underground pipes, as well as man-made drainage ditches on the New York City Police Academy campus and north of 28th Avenue, carry Mill Creek from the airport to the Flushing River. Since the outbreak of West Nile virus in New York in the late 1990s, the land has received frequent mosquito larvicide spraying.

As of 2000, Flushing Airport still had its air corridor reserved under FAA regulations. A company called Airships Unlimited has been lobbying to convert the abandoned airport into a "blimp port," citing the fact that Goodyear blimps used this airport in the 1960s. The benefit of this plan would be to preserve the air corridor for Flushing Airport.

In 2004, the Bloomberg administration proposed rezoning the area for commercial development as part of the already existing College Point Corporate Park. However, the plan has met significant protests from the local residents who fear such zoning would bring too much traffic to the area. The proposal has since been deferred.

As of September 2008, the access road was under reconstruction, to be reopened eventually as a regular public through-street. The north hangar was demolished on September 24. The remaining hangars were also demolished as of October 1. The street was opened to public use before August 2015.

See also
Floyd Bennett Field, another former civilian airport in Southeast Brooklyn

References

External links
From Flying High To Sinking Deep: The Life & Death Of An Airport, Queens Tribune
Return to the Wild Green Yonder
Into The Weedy Green Yonder
The College Point Airship Park or New York Blimp Port Project
Airfield Abandoned & Little-Known Airfields: New York City, Queens

Defunct airports in New York City
Airports in Queens, New York